Graeme Ian Thom (born 13 May 1967) is a former Zimbabwean cricketer. A right-handed batsman and right-arm medium pace bowler, he played one first-class match for Mashonaland Country Districts during the 1994–95 Logan Cup.

References

External links
 
 

1967 births
Living people
Cricketers from Harare
Mashonaland cricketers
Zimbabwean cricketers